Collective trust funds or Collective Investment Trusts (CITs) are a legal trust administered by a bank or trust company that combines assets for multiple investors who meet specific requirements set forth in the fund’s declaration of trust.  Typically, a collective trust pools assets from corporate and governmental profit sharing, pension and stock bonus plans, and charitable and other tax-exempt trusts. While operating in many respects similar to a mutual fund, a collective trust is not regulated by the U.S. Securities and Exchange Commission, but rather is established under Title 12, Section 9.18(a)(2) of the Code of Federal Regulations of the Office of the Comptroller of the Currency (OCC), a division within the U.S. Department of the Treasury.

CITs have existed since 1927. Their size in assets and importance in the retirement and pension fields have grown significantly in recent years. Estimated assets in collective trusts as of the end of 2016 exceeded $1.4 trillion. In many ways, CITs are similar to mutual funds, and thus, have become especially important in the defined contribution/401(k) market, as of 2016 growing to over $1.5 trillion in assets and comprising over 20% of defined contribution plan assets.

Overview
Collective trusts are often used in connection with defined benefit plans and, when they can be valued daily, with defined contribution plans as well. Collective trusts generally are excluded from the definition of an “investment company” under Section 3(c)(11) of the Investment Company Act of 1940, and interests in these funds are generally exempt from registration under Section 3(a)(2) of the Securities Act of 1933. In addition, transactions involving interests in collective trusts generally do not require an entity to register as a broker-dealer under Section 15(a) of the Securities Exchange Act of 1934. However, when collective trusts are composed of IRA assets or so-called “Keogh plans,” or marketed to the public, some or all of these securities law exclusions and exemptions may not be available; in these situations, registration under one or more federal securities laws could be required.

Although they have been available for decades, early versions of collective trusts provided investors with little access to underlying holdings data and were valued infrequently, typically only once per quarter. As a result, collective trusts were quickly overshadowed by mutual funds, which provide investor friendly features such as daily valuations and greater transparency. However, given the later focus on retirement plan fees and full disclosure, and in light of technological advances, collective trusts have gained market share in the defined benefit and defined contribution markets.

Collective trusts pursue a wide variety of investment strategies across the equity and fixed income spectrum.  These strategies may be passive (e.g., indexed or model-driven) or actively managed (e.g., pursuing growth or value strategies). In addition, in recent years collective trusts have pursued their investment strategies by employing more innovative investment techniques, such as investing in other investment vehicles or using more innovative investment instruments, such as exchange-traded funds. In addition to equity strategies, collective trusts also pursue a wide range of fixed income strategies, including actively managed strategies, passive strategies and others. Fixed income collective trust funds typically invest primarily in various types of debt instruments, such as Treasury bonds, Treasury bills, corporate bonds, sovereign government bonds, secured and unsecured loans, and different types of derivatives based on these instruments.

Pros and cons
Among the advantages of collective trusts versus other investment vehicles are: economies of scale, low operating costs, ease and speed of establishment, pricing and fee flexibility, diversification and access to investment talent. Disadvantages include less transparency than traditional mutual funds, difficulty tracking performance, less oversight of management, and an inability to rollover to an Individual Retirement Account.

References

Wills and trusts
Pensions
Banking
Financial services
Retirement plans in the United States